"Smooth Sailin'" is a song co-written and performed by American rhythm and blues singer Leon Bridges, issued as the second single from his debut studio album Coming Home. As of January 9, 2016, the song has reached #1 on the Billboard Triple A chart.

On December 5, 2015, Bridges performed "Smooth Sailin'" on Saturday Night Live.

Critical reception
"Smooth Sailin'" has received positive reviews. Gabriela Tully Claymore of Stereogum called it "a feel-good love song"; while Lauren Nostro of Complex referred to it as "a perfect, slow-burning track that [would] soundtrack [the listener's] entire summer". Paley Martin of Billboard stated that the song is "equal parts fresh and nostalgic" while complimenting Bridges' "signature retro sound with vocals that match".

Music video

The music video for "Smooth Sailin'" was directed by Vern Moen.

Charts

Weekly charts

Year-end charts

References

External links
 
 

2015 songs
2015 singles
Columbia Records singles
Leon Bridges songs
Songs written by Leon Bridges